Rifts is a multi-genre role-playing game created by Kevin Siembieda in August 1990 and published continuously by Palladium Books since then. Rifts takes place in a post-apocalyptic future, deriving elements from cyberpunk, science fiction, fantasy, horror, western, mythology and many other genres.

Rifts serves as a cross-over environment for a variety of other Palladium games with different universes connected through "rifts" on Earth that lead to different spaces, times, and realities that Palladium calls the "Rifts Megaverse". Rifts describes itself as an "advanced" role-playing game and not an introduction for those new to the concept.

Palladium continues to publish books for the Rifts series, with about 80 books published between 1990 and 2011. Rifts Ultimate Edition was released in August 2005 and designed to update the game with Palladium's incremental changes to its system, changes in the game world, and additional information and character types. The web site is quick to point out that this is not a second edition but an improvement and expansion of the original role playing game.

Background
The RPG had the tentative title Boomers, named after the original name for the Glitter Boy power armor until Kevin Siembieda changed the name after finding out it was in use for Bubblegum Crisis.

Setting 
The foundations for the Rifts world were originally developed in the Palladium game Beyond the Supernatural (first released in 1987), which uses Lovecraftian storytelling techniques for a role-playing experience based on horror fiction.

The Rifts world is Earth, but hundreds of years into the future. Ley lines, lines of magic energy, criss-cross the earth forming supernatural geographic areas such as the Bermuda Triangle. Points where Ley Lines intersect, called a nexus, are places of powerful magic, such as the Pyramids of Giza and Stonehenge. If a Ley Line nexus energy surges or is purposely activated, the very fabric of space and time can be torn, creating a rift, or a hole in space-time leading to another place, time, or a new/parallel dimension. Ley Lines in most lower capacity "realities" have less Potential Psychic Energy or PPE to allow them to be visible, but in the magic or PPE saturated worlds like Rifts Earth, they become visible based on PPE intensity. Some are visible during the day as evident by a slight blue shift of the surrounding environment. Otherwise at night or from space the massive bands of blue-white energy can be as large as half a mile wide in some places, and stretching for many miles.

The Magic energy making up Ley lines as mentioned is Potential Psychic Energy or PPE. Found in various places, objects, and animals, one of the greatest sources of PPE is in young and prepubescent children. An adult's level of PPE can vary based on other factors. PPE also allows Psionics which uses energy known as Inner Strength Points or ISP. Psychic phenomenon (more commonly called psioics) can also vary from individuals, ranging from none at all to Master level abilities. Psychic abilities can manifest in virtually any way imaginable. Some psychics develop differently, such as psi-stalkers; human mutants that feed on psychic energy.

Earth 

Rifts begins with two future-historical premises: first, a golden age of humanity occurs, with tremendous advances in science, technology, military, and society. Humanity as a whole is at peace as a majority of Earth's nations decide to cease world war and begin to share ideas and technology freely. Much of the solar system is conquered, humanity's wars will end, and harmony will reign. Second, that this golden age is followed by an unknown cause near the winter solstice and a rare planetary alignment, causing a disaster that cascades into tremendous destruction via a ripple effect.

The cataclysm begins with unprecedented storms of all kinds, earth quakes and tsunamis, and volcanic eruptions including the Yellowstone Caldera.

What is already a huge release of mystical energy is multiplied as a result of several special conditions: a rare multi-planetary alignment, occurrence during the Winter Solstice, and all at midnight.  The deaths of millions at this time amplifies these already high psychic energies, triggering many powerful natural disasters across the world, including the return of Atlantis.

The energy release from the deaths of millions more in turn releases even more mystic energy, causing more disasters in a vicious cycle. Ultimately, the total destruction brings an unprecedented energy release of billions.  Ley Line networks that crisscross the globe are energized as never before, causing rifts to open both on Earth and throughout the Megaverse.  Untold numbers of alien beings are pulled from their own home worlds, while Great Powers of the Megaverse are alerted of a new and valuable planet to conquer.

For hundreds of years after the holocaust, many creatures, both mythical beasts and alien beings, come through the Rifts – some of them now permanently opened  – to wreak additional havoc. The old world gone, a new Dark Age dawns and humanity's shrinking population is reduced, due to catastrophe and domestic failure, immeasurably.  This period is covered in Palladium's Rifts Chaos Earth spin-off series.

Rifts initially takes place in 101 P.A. (equivalent to the year 2387) 289 years after this event. The "Post-Apocalypse" calendar was established by the formation of the Coalition States in 2286.

While many different events that make up the world begin before and after this time, such as with the invasion of Chi-Town by the Federation of Magic (before) or as the Four Horsemen appear in Africa (after), this time frame is the setting for most "World Books" that describe a kind of snapshot in this phase (103-109 P.A). In the latest World Books, the current date is around 110 P.A. (2396).

By this time, most of the disasters have quieted down, though Earth is still bathed in the released PPE. The planet's mystical energy has added untold numbers of alien beings from other dimensions, who continue to arrive through the Rifts both accidentally and deliberately. The humanoid creatures that arrive on earth are referred to as Dimensional Beings (called D-Bees). Some are familiar fantasy races, such as elves and dwarfs, while others have never been seen before (created specifically for the game setting).  Non-humanoid creatures have also arrived, including monstrous creatures and mystical demons with hides as strong as tank armor. The most powerful (and a common theme in the Palladium Megaverse) are the Lovecraftian Alien Intelligences, living mountains of flesh with lidless eyes, wriggling tentacles, and great supernatural powers. In some rare cases, even the ancient gods of mythology have returned to reclaim their former lands.

To cope with these natural, supernatural, and alien menaces, the human race has adapted in a variety of ways, many of them borrowed from the technological developments of the lost Golden Age. Powered armor suits and giant robot vehicles are frequently used to combat the dangers of Rifts, but more invasive augmentation is common. This has three basic categories: "Juicers" do it chemically, the "Borgs" do it mechanically, and "Crazies" make use of performance-enhancing brain implants. All such augmentations boost strength, speed, endurance, and dexterity to superhuman levels. However, all come at great cost. Chemicals cause the body to wear out faster, decreasing life span to a few years. Mechanical Borg augmentation causes a loss of humanity when those with multiple limb and organ replacements become more machine than human. Brain implants cause mental instability ranging from mild phobias to crippling neurosis or psychosis.

Dangerous augmentations are often necessary dangers for humans in order to keep pace with the world around them, and those that choose augmentation accept these risks for the power they bring. Still others are required to receive augmentations either for self-defense, work, or even against their will as the minimalistic, needy, and weak are forced or coerced to serve. Some aren't aware of the dangers, and accept the augmentation blind to the side-effects.

Some turn to other means to become "more" than human. As magic abounds on Rifts Earth, many people turn to the magical arts. Others form pacts with alien intelligences or deities in exchange for great magical knowledge, risking becoming a pawn of the beings they dared turn to for power. Still others discover that they have great natural psionic potential, and dedicate their lives to discovering the abilities of their own minds.

The Ley Lines, formerly invisible, now dominate the landscape, appearing as massive lines of bluish energy half a mile wide, some twice that tall, stretching thousands of miles, crisscrossing the globe. The largest can even be seen from space.

North America 
The strongest power in North America is the Coalition States (CS). The governing body of the Coalition States is based in the arcological city of Chi-Town and lays claim to northern Illinois (the southern part being controlled by the "Federation of Magic") and all of Iowa. Other member states consist of "Lone Star", formed from the Texas Panhandle, who specialize in mutating animals into talking servants considered by many players as cannon fodder but is one of their primary weapons against the supernatural as without them they would have to rely solely on human psychics; Missouri; and Iron Heart which consists of the eastern half of Ontario, Canada.  The Coalition States are most often described as technologically advanced fascist human supremacists with a totalitarian government, restrictive internal media, restrictive education (such as enforced illiteracy), and a massive military. The Coalition is ruled by Emperor Karl Prosek, and is genocidally opposed to all aliens, D-bees (Dimensional Beings, to include humans from other times and even unlucky CS troops that have traveled through a Rift and survived to return... only to be "contained" by his former comrades), human mutations, and Magic. His ultimate goal is to control the Earth by humans and for humans, and do so by attacking anything and everyone that is foreign to Earth as it was before the cataclysm.  Nevertheless, Prosek allows some of the less threatening non-humans to live alongside lesser-privileged humans in the burbs surrounding Chi-Town.  Most of these poor souls think that they may eventually gain citizenship so they can live within the protective walls of the arcology.

The second greatest power is "Free Quebec". At one time it was a Coalition State, but constant disagreement with Chi-Town over issues like Glitter Boy production, education level of the populace, and use of mutant animals, led to secession and eventually a short civil war. A cease-fire was signed (mainly due to the CS's bigger problem with Tolkeen), but distrust has remained.

Mexico is ruled by a group of vampire kingdoms, who treat humans as little more than cattle to feed upon. North of the Rio Grande, west of Texas and roaming most of the American Southwest are large nomadic bands/tribes of bandits who collectively form the "Pecos Empire" which incorporates the cities of El Paso, Los Alamos (formerly Austin) and "Houstown", its unofficial capital. Though the nation is not part of a cohesive power structure or political organization, "Emperor Sabre Laser" is attempting to unite the city-states under his banner. Much of the western United States has more or less willingly reverted to a mix of modern and past technology, and the days of the Wild West, where outlaws ride hovercycles into battle, cowboys are as likely to raise dinosaurs as they are cattle, cyborgs prospect for gold and other minerals, and wild buffalo, sent to another dimension to prevent their extinction, have returned to the plains in the millions. American Natives have divided into two groups. The Traditionalists, who were also taken by the spirit people and returned to Earth along with the Bison, refuse to use most items of technology, preferring the old ways.  Then there is the modern camp, who have designed many technological marvels of their own.  The pockets of civilization include the "Colorado Baronies", Hope, Testament, Wilmington, and Charity, a collective of small and a few large towns, founded by the survivors of the Denver area. In Arizona, the "Clarkdale Confederacy" (Clarkdale, Jerome, and Cottonwood), has managed to survive even as Flagstaff, Prescott and Phoenix have collapsed around them; there is also the town founded and run by mercenaries known as "Arzno".

The Royal Canadian Mounted Police managed to survive the great cataclysm, though Canada itself did not. The Mounties have become an independent law enforcement force called the Tundra Rangers, patrolling the northern wilderness.

The Midwest, both upper and central, is home to most of North America's population. The Manistique Imperium and Northern Gun in Michigan's Upper Peninsula, both Coalition allies, are among the biggest weapons manufacturing areas on the continent. "New Lazlo" is one of the largest cities in Michigan's southern portion. Chillicothe in Missouri is a large supplier of Coalition food processing and growing. However, Missouri's southern half, home to the city-states of "Whykin" (Poplar Bluff) and "Kingsdale" (West Plains) are in constant opposition to the CS and claim independence. North Dakota is home to the Wilk's firearms corporation, though not much else. Arkansas is home to the independent CS ally "El Dorado". Southern Illinois and the Ohio Valley is home to the "Federation of Magic". Also in the Ohio Valley is "Psyscape": a city-state founded by Psychics.

"Tolkeen" was a major city in the former Minneapolis region in early Rifts books; the city welcomed users of magic. A military campaign made by the Coalition States (which is the primary event of 109 PA) resulted in the magic-user kingdom being wiped off the map (this is covered in the highly debated six-volume series of source/storybooks "Coalition Wars: Siege on Tolkeen").

In the Northeast, the city-state of "Lazlo", named after the great 20th century supernatural researcher and writer Victor Lazlo (from another Palladium RPG, "Beyond The Supernatural"), was built upon the ruins of the Canadian city of Toronto. This major center of civilization is well known as a melting pot of humans, D-Bees and other, stranger beings, and is the home of Techno-Wizardry. "Mad Haven" is the name given to the ruins of Manhattan Island, although tectonic forces during the cataclysm have moved it into the coast creating a peninsula. It is seen by most denizens of Rifts Earth as a refuge of demons and madness.

South America 
The return of Atlantis has caused the Amazon River basin to flood most of the western part of South America, giving it the nickname "The Land of a Thousand Islands". In Colombia, a nation of humans and Dwarves fight against a kingdom of Vampires. The gods of the Inca  have returned to their ancient holdings in the Andes, and fight a battle against alien invaders known as the "Arkons". Coming together as one, the "Empire of the Sun" has created a wide range of technology and magic, including "Nazca Line Magic", exclusive to the Empire. The Empire incorporates the cities of Cuzco, Nazca, Arequipa and Lima. Much of the rest of the continent is a wide collection of states ranging from democracies, corrupt oligarchies, and communist guerrillas known as Shining Path, to Mutants, Amazons, Aliens, Transdimensional Mercenaries, pre-historic creatures and dozens of others.

In what was once Argentina, the "Silver River Republics" of Cordoba (the "South American Chi-Town"), Santiago (one of the most tolerant Human nations on Rifts Earth), Achilles (a nation founded by Mutants) and New Babylon (a nation where Humans and a race of Aliens live side by side) have thrived and created nations whose strength rivals that of the CS.

In what was once Bolivia freed Human and D-Bees slave soldiers, of the race called "Dakir", have formed the "Megaversal Legion": a mercenary company with one of the highest levels of technology on Rifts Earth (possibly even the Megaverse). Their Inertia Beam weapons are truly one of a kind, allowing them to keep the edge over all opponents they face.

Europe 
 England has become a vast wilderness again, broken up by the occasional giant Millennium Tree or feudal kingdom, complete with a New Camelot and a new King Arthur, partially being manipulated by the ethereal extension of an alien intelligence (disguised as the wizard Merlin). Also the magic of Druids and Faeries has become commonplace.
 In Germany, the New German Republic, with assistance from the Triax corporation, battles against an empire of Gargoyles that has apparently conquered much of Europe.
 France has already been overrun by Gargoyle hordes and other monsters and cults. New Camelot, the NGR, and the Gargoyle Empire are all making moves into the territory as well.
 Russia is ruled by a collection of Warlords, who rule through the use of vast armies and Cyborg troops. The only major civilized nation is the "Sovietski", all that truly remain of the pre-Rifts Russian Empire and a trade partner of the NGR, who, like them, are in constant battle with the Gargoyle and Brodkil Empires.

Asia 
Much of China has been overrun by demons. The remnants of the People's Republic of China live in the pre-Rifts subterranean city Geofront, possessing pre-rifts technology equal or exceeding any other human nation on Rifts Earth, fighting to free their nation from the grip of the Yama Kings.

Japan has become a mixture of tradition and technology. The Samurai and warrior monks of the New Empire battle Oni demons and high-tech raiders from the Otomo Shogunate. Despite their ardent anti-technology sentiments, one of the New Empire's closest allies is the Republic of Japan, an alliance centered on three pre-Rifts cities (Hiroshima, Iwakuni, and Kure) accidentally rifted off the planet at the exact moment of the Great Cataclysm, and sent hundreds of years into their future. The rest of the archipelago (which now has the pre-Rifts main island of Honshū divided into two islands from the risen sea levels) is dominated by smaller breakaway governments; a significant portion of the northern half of Japan is dominated by Oni and other denizens from Rifts called the Zone.

Korea - both North and South - has been completely overrun by demons with nothing remaining of the pre-Rifts nations.

Africa 
Much of Africa has gone back to nature, making the land a wild, mysterious Dark Continent again, where only those foolhardy enough to ignore the cautionary tales would willingly go.

In Egypt, the ley lines coursing through the pyramids have brought Rama-Set, an evil oriental-type Dragon who has conquered the locals and established the Phoenix Empire (with Rama-Set, in human form, leading it as Pharaoh).

Meanwhile, the Four Horsemen of the Apocalypse (the powerful supernatural beings legends named War, Famine, Pestilence, and Death) are traveling across the continent, seeking to reunite and combine their powers into an ultimate destroyer of a monster; but a group of powerful adventurers is hot on their tails, including the legendary rogue scholar Erin Tarn (marked for death by the Coalition States for her writings, which criticize the Coalition States), and the 20th century's most accomplished time-displaced expert on the paranormal, Victor Lazlo (whose writings were so popular among P.A. magic-users that they named a kingdom after him), and even the disguised (and unfortunately amnesiac) Egyptian Goddess Isis. (See Rifts: World Book 4: Africa)

Atlantis 

The lost continent of Atlantis appeared after the cataclysm that caused the rifts. According to some it rose from the sea, but more accurately it returned from an alternate dimension to which it had shifted to ages ago.

Now controlled by the Splugorth, a race of Supernatural Intelligences, Atlantis is a land ruled by magic and monsters. An inter-dimensional marketplace where any number of creatures, including humans, are bought and sold as slaves, and often serve as fodder in gladiatorial arenas. Enhanced by parasites or other magic, they are then pitted against one another or bizarre, monstrous creatures.

The Splugorth are evil, trans-dimensional conquerors that are reminiscent of supernatural entities described in the works of H. P. Lovecraft. They are huge, tentacled monstrosities with a giant eye atop their massive, amorphous bodies. The Splugorth rule through the use of subject races enslaved by Bio-Wizardry, a form of mysticism that involves the use of parasites and symbiotes to enhance one's abilities. The Splugorth are also masters of Rune Magic (such as the creation of the fabled rune weapons), an offshoot of Bio-Wizardry. They are an evil power that spans many dimensions and are the sworn enemies of the True Atlanteans who have been banished from Atlantis. The Splugorth minions are a particular threat on the coast lines of adjacent North and South America, conducting slave raids against human and D-Bee settlements to feed the insatiable hunger of the Atlantean slave markets, and in some cases, the hunger (often literal) of Atlantis' extradimensional visitors.

Australia 
A vast inland sea has flooded the centre of the continent leaving notable landmarks like Uluru completely submerged. With the return of magic to the land, the Aborigines have enjoyed resurgence and many practice Dreamtime magic. The "civilized" world has devolved into often competing city-states, with Melbourne and Perth the most technologically advanced. In the "Northland" exist the races known as the Mokoloi and Shadow People.

The Oceans 
Deep within the Mariana Trench, a massive, evil Alien Intelligence known as the Lord of the Deep (sometimes mistakenly believed by survivors of its rampages on Rifts Earth to be the Kraken or Leviathan) slowly grows ever larger in size and may someday try to devour every living thing on the planet. It is opposed by the Whale Singers, rebellious creations of the monster, and the descendants of the United States Navy, now called the "New Navy". Other forces above and below the waves include a floating city known as Tritonia, pirates including the ruthless aliens known as the "Horune", monsters, dolphins/orca/whales, and extradimensional invaders.

Other settings 
Further supplements to the Rifts game have expanded the setting to include:

Mutants in Orbit - Several Space Stations and Colonies existed in orbit at the time of the Great Cataclysm. The descendants of their inhabitants, including many Moreau-style mutant animals, still survive in space, fighting against each other, and trying to prevent any force from entering or leaving Earth.  (For use with Rifts & After The Bomb.)
The Three Galaxies - an alternative space opera setting of a series of galaxies centered on the planet and dimensional nexus of Phase World. Several explorers, cults, and interstellar and intergalactic states are involved in the search for the Cosmic Forge, a powerful artifact that is said to have created the universe.
Skraypers - Superheroes lead a resistance movement against alien conquerors amongst the massive cities of their home planet. Like Mutants in Orbit, Skraypers is designed for both Rifts (where it is set in the Three Galaxies), and another Palladium game, in this case Heroes Unlimited.
Wormwood - Knights and symbiote-bearing warriors fight against demons on a living planet.
Rifts Chaos Earth - Earth as it was during and immediately after the devastation of the Apocalypse. (Was supposed to be an alternate Earth where the governments and civilizations of the Golden Age were able to stay intact all because the first nuke strike was one minute after midnight.)
Manhunter Universe - an alternative dimension to Rifts:Earth, published as a sourcebook under license from Palladium Books by Myrmidon Press. In this dimension, humankind fights an intense battle against artificially intelligent robots bent on human extermination.
Additionally any other Palladium RPG can become the setting for a Rifts style campaign.
ALL Palladium Books - though the above sourcebooks are more specifically related to Rifts all of Palladium's games are considered to be within the same "megaverse" and so all of their other games can be used as source books.  Though the canon incarnation of Chaos Earth is Rifts' past it is also commonly accepted that Beyond the Supernatural is the distant past (due to the presence of the same mystic energy AND use of Lazlo's name) which may or may not include Ninjas and Superspies, Heroes Unlimited, After the Bomb (or if you have the books Teenage Mutant Ninja Turtles), System Failure, Dead Reign and even Nightspawn/bane or Robotech or Macross II. But Palladium Fantasy RPG or Recon happen in entirely different dimensions so could be source books but not Rifts' past. While Splycers on the other hand is intentionally a big mystery it may or may not be an alternate reality or a completely different dimension so as Kevin likes to point out so often, it is all up to the GM.
Anything - if you like the system but you have an old favorite character... convert it. Conversions are encouraged but due to copyright issues Kevin doesn't want any conversions that have a basis copyrighted by someone else posted on the Palladium Forums.

Weapons and technology 
Despite the near-total collapse of human civilization, most of the powerful technology managed to survive the centuries. There are many reasons given for the survival or rapid development of the high technology. In The New German Republic/Triax Industries the infrastructure survived. In the case of the Coalition States it is suggested that their benefactor is a rogue artificial intelligent computer named ARCHIE 3. In Japan the main technology base is a part of the country that was "rifted" from Earth's past. The technology, regardless of the unlikelihood of the varied factions obtaining it, is in fact instrumental to the continued survival of mankind in a world where many creatures now can survive being struck by the main gun of a battle tank.

The most prolific weapons on Rifts Earth, in nearly all regions, are energy weapons. The most common are lasers, ion beams, plasma cannons, and particle beams. Also popular are rail guns, and miniaturized rockets inappropriately called Mini-Missiles, as they have no guidance system. Due to the proliferation of supernatural monsters such as vampires, silver-plated melee weapons and silver-plated bullets have also risen in popularity. For more conventional opponents, vibro-blades (knives, swords, and other edged weapons whose edges vibrate very rapidly to increase cutting power) are the weapon of choice for hand-to-hand combat.

Rail guns are highly advanced in Rifts, and are used in a way similar to machine guns in modern times. However, the weapon, ammunition belts/drums/clips, and energy packs to power the weapon make most rail guns very heavy, and are usually restricted to Powered Armor, 'Borgs, and vehicles. One of the most famous rail guns on Rifts Earth is the RG13 Rapid Acceleration Electro-Magnetic Rail Gun known as the "Boom Gun" used famously by the USA-G10 Glitter Boy power armor. It is a weapon so powerful that it creates an immensely deafening sonic boom whenever it is fired that shatters glass for hundreds of yards around.

Ion weapons are also popular, presumably because they do provide sound and recoil unlike lasers.

Heavy weapons are generally Plasma or Particle-beam weapons, which have great stopping power, but also generally have a short range.

Alongside hover vehicles and Powered Armor, a common vehicle used in battle in Rifts Earth is the Giant Robot. In addition to their role as war machines, Giant Robots are also intimidating, and turned out to be good in combating very large supernatural creatures (such as dragons, demons, and giants).

An increasingly popular use of technology is Techno-Wizardry, which is a fusion of magic and technology. The aims of Techno-Wizardry are to use magic not only to power technology, but to make it more effective than it was prior to magic infusion. Techno-Wizardry also encompasses the creation of more traditional magic weapons, so a Techno-Wizard can make both a flaming sword or a plasma cannon, often with many of the same components and spells.

The ultimate in magic are Rune Weapons, indestructible, extremely powerful weapons with the life-force of an intelligent being driving them. Rune weapons are capable of communicating with their wielders, animating and fighting by themselves, casting magic, and may harm potential users if they don't like their motives and personality (based on the RPG tradition of assigning an "alignment" to a character of good, selfish or evil), and can bind themselves psychically to those they do. Some of the strongest Rune Weapons, reminiscent of Michael Moorcock's fictional sword Stormbringer, are Soul Drinkers, capable of tearing the soul out of their victims, irrevocably killing them with only the slightest scratch.

System

Character classes 
While the game books rapidly expanded the number of character classes to a large number, the original game book contained four overall character groups with approximately 4 to 5 character classes per group.
 Men of Arms are the combat specialists of the game. They include cyborgs, freelance warriors called Headhunters, the Coalition Army, the Glitterboy powered armor pilot (the Glitterboy named for its laser proof chrome alloy armor), the Cyber-Knight psychic warrior, the drug enhanced Juicer who will die in a few years as a side effect, and the Crazy who has microchips installed into their brains to force higher performance and psychic abilities at the expense of their sanity.
 Scholars and Adventurers. These are the wilderness scout, the rogue scientist, the rogue scholar, the Cyber-doctor, the Operator (a mechanic second to none), City-Rat street punk and computer hacker, and even a vagabond who has minimal gear and skills.
 Racial Character Classes. These are not trades or skills you learn, but a group of classes that were born with their powers. They include hatchling dragons, the Dog-Boy from the Coalition which is a mutated dog that walks upright, talks, and can psychically detect the supernatural, the Psi-Stalker which is more powerful than a Dog-Boy, but must also feed on mystic energy which a Dog-Boy does not, the Burster with psychic powers over fire, and the Mind Melter with large amounts of psychic power.
 Men of Magic. These are the Ley Line Walker with special abilities when on Ley Lines and normal magic spell casting, the Shifter who is taught their magic by an external supernatural creature and specialize in travel magic, the Mystic who is instinctive and self-taught and half psychic, the Techno-Wizard who can install magical properties into technological devices

Damage and firepower 
One important note about Rifts versus other game systems is scale: weaponry and combat in Rifts are generally far more destructive than in other gaming systems. For example, in Rifts and other Palladium games, a simple knife inflicts between 1 and 4 "points" of damage. This point system makes sense when considering a small animal killed has between 1 and 4 "hit points," which make it realistic that it could be killed by a single strike. Yet even a basic Rifts-era laser pistol will cause between 100 and 400 points of damage (more than enough to totally destroy a small car in one shot). This means someone shot by such a laser pistol would be literally cut in half without protective armor and trees, bystanders, or anything else in the line of fire would meet a similar fate. Thus, an average player character in Rifts Earth with standard-issue armor and weapons has the effective durability and firepower of a modern tank. Even minimal skirmishes may leave deep craters or even level towns from collateral damage.

To accommodate this scale, Mega Damage Capacity or MDC is an important game concept. Each point of mega-damage is equal to 100 points of "Structural Damage" or SDC. Armor and vehicles of this power level have protection of equivalent levels. For example, most personal body armor in the Rifts setting has on average 40 to 80 MDC, comparable to a modern-day tank, and Rifts armored vehicles start around 100-200 MDC and go up from there. Exceedingly powerful beings such as Dragons, gods and alien intelligences have mega-damage bodies caused by the high levels of magic energy present in this game setting, and their MDC can soar into the thousands, if not tens of thousands.

As Rifts has no systematic method of designing weaponry, the game is criticized frequently for severe power escalation; often magic, equipment, and character classes from new books are more potent than those from an earlier one (sometimes even with the same character class), with the result of many thinking they are thus required to buy the most recent supplement to keep up with the power curve (This is parodied in an 8-bit Theater episode fittingly titled "Glitter Boy"). Rifts Conversion Books are designed to help facilitate the transition of magic and psychic characters and creatures from other Palladium game lines into this new landscape, for which many automatically gain increased benefits due to the magic-rich environment.  But a pistol or rifle that fires projectiles in our time fires the same bullets with the same effects during Rifts times and is effectively useless in most combat situations. It does retain certain value as an antique, and from a survival standpoint can be desirable as a hunting weapon.

Skills 
Rifts, like other Palladium games, use percentile dice to calculate skill success. Each character, based on training, intelligence, and experience level, has a base percentage chance of success. If a number equal to or below a player's percentage is rolled on percentile dice, then the use of the skill is considered to be a success. While modifiers are suggested in cases of unusual difficulty or proficiency, these are rare in the system, usually reserved for special skills. Some criticize this as being more cumbersome than the D&D D20 System while Palladium defends their method as allowing for a wider variety of skills.

However, Combat is determined through the use of 20 sided dice. In its most basic form the combat system is an opposed roll of two dice, with additions and subtractions for character skills and environmental factors. One character will generally be offensive, the other defensive, and the highest dice roll will determine if the defender is struck by the offensive character's attack.

Spinoffs and alternate editions 
Several novels, a MUD, several mush/muxs and large amounts of fan fiction have been based on the world of Rifts. A licensed Rifts video game (Rifts: Promise of Power), was released in November 2005 for the Nokia N-Gage.

Siembieda has stated that he would like to see Rifts games developed for other consoles. However, he has stated that the niche nature of the role-playing game industry means it is hard to attract prospective developers to the property.

RIFTS Collectible Card Game
RIFTS Collectible Card Game is an out-of-print collectible card game released in September 2001 and was also one of the last games made by Precedence. It was based on the role-playing game. Precedence spent more time developing this game than any other. The core set had 286 cards with an additional 38 fixed cards released in a starter box format designed to sit on a bookshelf next to the RPG. The fixed cards had different stats than the booster pack versions. Two additional promo cards were also available and their names were homages to Diamond Comic Distributors and Gilbert Gottfried. The game is set 300 years in the future where dimensional anomalies called "rifts" have beset the world and through which aliens, demons, gods, and magical forces invade Earth. Each player adopts the role of a post-holocaust nation such as CyberWorks or the Tolkeen. The game is played so that the first person to run out of cards, loses the game.

The game included artwork by Mark Evans, among others, that creator Kevin Siembieda's had a desire to reprint in an art book. It featured characters such as Fury Iron Juggernaut, General Ross Underhill, and King Victor Macklin. Eventually, the artwork was republished in the RIFTS Ultimate Edition RPG book. The book reproduced approximately 75 images from the CCG.

According to author Jane Frank, players thought the game artwork and game detail were excellent.

The Breaking Dads podcast reviewed the game and noted the company was hosting organized play events and gave retail support, when publisher support for the game immediately ceased as the company went out of business. They also remarked you couldn't play the full game with the starter packs alone but rather a "dumbed down" version of the game. Essentially, the game suffered from lack of expansions and felt "too basic", though they did mention the designer in an archived listserv addressed cards like Counter Attack, Event cards, as well as, adding new factions in future expansions.

Savage Rifts
In 2015 Pinnacle Entertainment Group announced a series of supplements converting Rifts to the Savage Worlds system. April 2016 Pinnacle announced a 2-month Kickstarter. By November 2016 they had dubbed this project Savage Rifts.

Titles released in the series include:
The Tomorrow Legion's Player's Guide (PG)
Game Master's Handbook (GM)
Savage Foes of North America (SFoNA)
Character Folio
Archetypes Set 1
Archetypes Set 2
Coalition Field Manual
Contamination Principle

Adventures:
The Garnet Town Gambit (TGTG)
Tome of Destiny

Reception
In Issue 48 of Challenge, Lester W. Smith found the information about rifts and the new Earth gave both players and referees a good base of knowledge. He especially liked the section on magic, saying, "The magic system, when taken as a whole, is clear, concise and logical, explaining magic in general in a new and 'realistic' light." However, he didn't like the lack of an introductory adventure, commenting, "For a game that is meant to stand alone, it’s surprising that no introductory scenario was included. Nor were any character sheets, handouts or pull-outs provided to aid the players." Smith had thought that the completely new rules system would clear up some of the long-standing problems with old Palladium rule systems. However, Smith found that "Instead of clearing up old discrepancies, Rifts creates many of its own." He also found the rules badly organized. Despite these issues, Smith concluded, "I highly recommend Rifts because of its setting and potential for great scenarios. [...] There is enough here to keep any GM busy thinking up new scenarios and creating new archvillains for players for quite a while."

In Issue 13 of Arcane (December 1996), Lucya Sachnowski was disappointed in the Rifts World Book 11: Coalition War Campaign, saying that "There are just five pages of short adventure ideas which are usable and versatile - providing a good mixture of combat and moral dilemmas - but they aren't enough." She gave the book a below-average rating of 6 out of 10.

In a readers' poll conducted by the UK magazine Arcane in 1996 to determine the 50 most popular role-playing games of all time, Rifts was ranked 22nd. The magazine editor Paul Pettengale commented: "It's the ultimate in old-style high-energy RPGs. It uses a class-and-level system, and its supplements are full of new character classes, as well as weapons, robots and power armour. Fantasy-style creatures are a bit less common, and tend to be rather conventional elves and orcs - although it's perfectly possible to play a baby dragon. One of the key concepts is 'mega-damage', which is important when you're playing with giant robots and such. This is the game for people who want to have everything possible in their campaigns - and then to blow a lot of it up with cool super-weapons."

Other reviews and commentary
White Wolf #26 (April/May, 1991)

References

External links 
Rifts official discussion board at Palladium Books Forums of the Megaverse
Rifts at RPG Geek Database
Rifts at RPGnet Game Index

 
Megaverse (Palladium Books)
American role-playing games
Post-apocalyptic role-playing games
Role-playing games introduced in 1990
Science fantasy role-playing games
Science fiction role-playing games
Video games about parallel universes
Alternate history role-playing games
Collectible card games
Dark fantasy role-playing games
Dystopian fiction
Fantasy worlds
Artificial intelligence in fiction
Brain–computer interfacing in fiction
Cyborgs in fiction
Demons in popular culture
Fiction about magic
Genetic engineering in fiction
Mutants in fiction
Nanotechnology in fiction
Fiction about robots
Transhumanism in fiction
Vampires in popular culture